Ventotene Lighthouse is an active lighthouse on the Ventotene Island placed nearby the Porto Romano.

Description
The lighthouse is completely automated and managed by the Marina Militare with the identification code number 2286 E.F.

See also
List of lighthouses in Italy

References

External links 
 Servizio Fari Marina Militare 

Lighthouses in Italy